Dianthus crinitus is a species of Dianthus in the carnation family found in northwestern Africa, the eastern Aegean Islands, Anatolia, the Transcaucasus and the North Caucasus, Lebanon, Syria, Iran, the Gulf States, and Oman. Common names may be associated more with some subspecies than others, and include hairy carnation and longhaired pink. It grows on serpentine soils.

Subspecies
A number of subspecies have been described:

Dianthus crinitus subsp. baldzhuanicus (Lincz.) Rech.f.
Dianthus crinitus subsp. kermanensis Rech.f.
Dianthus crinitus subsp. nuristanicus (Gilli) Rech.f.
Dianthus crinitus subsp. soongoricus (Schischk.) Kozhevn.
Dianthus crinitus subsp. tetralepis (Nevski) Rech.f.
Dianthus crinitus subsp. turcomanicus (Schischk.) Rech.f.

References

crinitus
Plants described in 1794